Neuenburg Castle (German: Schloss Neuenburg) is a hilltop castle overlooking Freyburg, a town in the state of Saxony-Anhalt, Germany.

The castle was built around 1090 by the Thuringian count Ludwig der Springer, securing his territory in the east, as did its sister castle Wartburg in the west. The name Neuenburg derives from German for "new castle".

From 1656 until 1746 it was a secondary residence of the Dukes of Saxe-Weissenfels.

References

External links

 Page at Transromanica.com (German)
 Website of Strasse der Romanik (German)

Castles in Saxony-Anhalt
Romanesque Road
Buildings and structures in Burgenlandkreis